Horace A. Bass or Horace Bass may refer to:

Horace A. Bass Jr. (1915–1942), U.S. Navy officer and naval aviator
USS Horace A. Bass (APD-124), a United States Navy high-speed transport